Vernon College is a public community college in Vernon, Texas.

History
The two-year Vernon Regional Junior College welcomed its first student body of 608 in 1972, and had a Board of Trustees of seven members. In 1970, the Wilbarger County voters had elected to establish the college. The 1973  campus was located at Texas State Highway 70 and US 287. Since its establishment, the college has undergone expansion that came to include a baseball team, Sheppard Learning Center; Department of Vocational Nursing, Wichita Falls; VRJC Technical Center, Wichita Falls; Career Development Center, Wichita Falls; Seymour Learning Center; Burkburnett Learning Center; Iowa Park Learning Center.  In 2001, the college officially changed its name to Vernon College.

The Red River Valley Museum is located on the main campus.

Presidents
David L. Norton (1972-1974)
Jim M. Williams (1974-1982)
Joe Mills (1982-1990)
Wade Kirk (1990-2000)
Steve Thomas (2000-2008)
Dusty R. Johnston (2008–present)

Service area
Vernon College's service area includes twelve counties in North Texas.

Archer
Baylor
Clay
Cottle
Foard
Hardeman

Haskell
King
Knox
Throckmorton
Wichita
Wilbarger

References

External links
 Official website

Universities and colleges accredited by the Southern Association of Colleges and Schools
Community colleges in Texas
Education in Wilbarger County, Texas
Education in Wichita County, Texas
Buildings and structures in Wilbarger County, Texas
Buildings and structures in Wichita Falls, Texas
1972 establishments in Texas
Educational institutions established in 1972